Král komiků is a Czech comedy film starring Vlasta Burian. It was released in 1963.

External links
 Film at csfd.cz 

1963 films
Czechoslovak comedy films
1963 comedy films
Czech comedy films
1960s Czech films